The Restless Trio is a 1982 Hong Kong action comedy television series produced by TVB and starring Andy Lau, Stephen Tung and Patricia Chong.

Plot
In Pak Tau town near the provincial capital during the era of the Republic of China, rich heir Chin Yat-tim (Andy Lau) falls in love with Cho-cho (Patricia Chong), a prostitute working on a flower boat. Yat-tim deliberately gets close to Cho-cho to please her. However, Cho-cho's heart belonged to her childhood friend, Wong Siu-po (Stephen Tung), a poor worker of the flower boat. Although Siu-po has feelings for Cho-cho, she did not dare to confess to her due to his poverty and low social status. Later, under a strange combination of circumstances, Cho-cho was forced to marry rich tycoon  Lui Chin-pang (Lau Dan).

In actuality, Lui is a pirate. One day, after successfully robbing treasures, he was discovered by Ko Yung (Lau Siu-ming), who wanted a share of the treasures. As a result, the two launched an attack against one another, causing havoc on the flower boat.

After Lui's identity was exposed and was arrested, Cho-cho regains her freedom and reunites with Siu-po. At this time, Yat-tim gets Siu-po and Cho-cho's help during a family crisis. Being grateful to the two, Yat-tim reconciles with Siu-po and exits the love triangle between him, Cho-cho and Siu-po, and is determined to accomplish a major achievement.

Cast
Andy Lau as Chin Yat-tim
Stephen Tung as Wong Siu-po
Patricia Chong as Cho-cho
Kwok Fung as Mak Chiu
Lau Siu-ming as Ko Yung
Lee Heung-kam as Aunt Pui
Lau Dan as Lui Chin-pang
Chong Man-ching as Chan Kiu
Liu Wai-hung as Double-finger Chat
David Lo as Director
Albert Lo as Wong Wai
Ma Hing-sang as Young Master Ngau
Wong Chu-chi as Beggar Chu
Man Kit-wan as Chun-to
Bonnie Wong as Po-yuet (抱月)
Ho Kwai-lam as Young Master Wong
Ho Kwong-lun as Fu
Lau Wai-hoi
Wong Sze-yan
Lai Pik-kwong
Leung Siu-chau as Lui Chin-pang's underling
Mak Chi-wan as Lui Chin-pang's underling
Ng Pok-kwan
Chan Wing-fai
Tse Ming-chong
Yim Kin-wah
Lee Kin-chuen as Chin Yat-tim's misfit friend
Lo Tin-wai as Chin Yat-tim's misfit friend
Cheng Hau-wah as Chin Yat-tim's misfit friend
Wong Yuen-yung as Prostitute
Choi Wai-mei as Prostitute
Lau Yee-nei as Prostitute
Au Yim-lin as Prostitute
Wong So-mei as Prostitute
Lau Hung-fong as Prostitute
Lok Kung as Chin Kui-fu
Cho Chai as Man Chat
Chan Yau-hau as Chan Tai-man
Tsui Kwong-lam as Wood chopper
Tse Chi-yeung
Ng Wah-san
Wu Po-wah as Theatre actor
Lee Wai-mui as Theatre actor
Peggy Lam as Theatre actor
Law Ching-ho as Theatre actor
Chan Pak-san as Theatre actor
Yeung Sam-lun as Theatre actor
Tang Yu-chiu as Theatre actor
Chun Kwok-lim as Theatre actor
Tsui Suk-fong as Theatre actor
Keung Pui-lei as Theatre actor
Ho Wai-yee
Ling Hon as Uncle Chat
Lo Kwok-wai
Tsang Cho-lam
Yung Sau-yee
Tang Sun-nin
Shek Siu-lun
Chin Sui-hing
Stephen Chow as Tea house customer
Ai Wai
Tam Yat-ching
Bobby Tsang
Tam Chuen-hing
Leung Kit-wah as Wong Wai's cousin
Lee Yuk-man
Hui Yat-wah
Sit Choi-ha
Lo Heung-ning
Chan On-ying
Wai Yee-yan as Chui-heung
Pak Lan
Ho Wai-nam
Wong Chak-fung as Tea house staff

See also
Andy Lau filmography
List of TVB series (1982)

References

External links
The Restless Trio at MyTV

TVB dramas
1982 Hong Kong television series debuts
1982 Hong Kong television series endings
Hong Kong action television series
Martial arts television series
Hong Kong comedy television series
Period television series
1980s Hong Kong television series
Cantonese-language television shows
Television shows set in Guangdong